Ariel Henry (born 6 November 1949) is a Haitian neurosurgeon and politician who has served as the acting prime minister of Haiti and the acting president of Haiti since 20 July 2021. He later became involved in a controversy due to his refusal to cooperate with the authorities over his links with Joseph Felix Badio, one of the suspects accused of orchestrating the assassination of President Jovenel Moïse on 7 July 2021. Officers who investigated the case suspected Henry was involved with planning the assassination.

Education
Henry served as a resident in neurosurgery with Professor Claude Gros in the French city of Montpellier, from March 1977 to December 1981. He studied neurophysiology and neuropathology at the University of Montpellier's  from 1981 to 1984, and presented his doctoral thesis in January 1982. He also received a certificate in performing electroencephalography from the University of Montpellier in September 1983.

In 1989, he completed his Master of Public Health in international health from Loma Linda University and his postdoctoral studies in international health management methods at Boston University from February to May 1990.

Medical career 

Henry was a professor at the Private Nursing School of Montpellier from September 1980 to June 1981. From January 1982 to December 1983, he was employed as an assistant in neurosurgery to Professor Claude Gros at the  university hospital in Montpellier. He also served as an assistant to Professor Philippe Frèrebeau at the same hospital from October 1983 to February 1985, and was employed as an assistant professor during his time there.

Henry was employed as a neurosurgeon at the State University of Haiti Hospital from 1987 to 1996, while also serving as a professor of neurosurgery at the hospital from October 1985 to February 1995 and professor of psychophysiology at the university's faculty of human sciences from November 1988 to June 1996. He has been a professor of neurology at the university's faculty of medicine since October 1990.

From December 1987 to January 2010, he was a consultant in neurosurgery and neurology at the Saint Vincent Centre for Disabled Children in Port-au-Prince, the capital of Haiti.

Henry was also a tutor at the Loma Linda University's "Master of Public Health" program, which was held off-campus, from 1989 to 1991, and a professor of neurology at the Quisqueya University from October 1999 to January 2010. He served as an advisor to the Minister of Health of Haiti from March 1993 to February 1995, as well as a consultant to the Pan American Health Organization and World Health Organization from 1993 to 1996.

He was the director of the Adventist Development and Relief Agency-Haiti's "Child Survival Project in Urban and Rural Areas" from November 1985 to February 1992, director of "Nutritional Rehabilitation Clinics" program from January 1986 to November 1989, deputy director of its overall programs from 1992 to 1996, and consultant for evaluating its "PL-480" program in 1998. He was also the director of health for the Adventist Church in Haiti, the French West Indies and French Guiana. From 1992 to 1999, he served as the chairman of the board of directors of the Ecumenical Welfare Society.

Henry has served as an associate member of the French Society of Neurosurgery since 1984, a member of the National Committee to Evaluate Polio Eradication in Haiti since it was created in March 1990, and head of the neurosurgery department of the Bernard Mevs Hospital since October 2014. He led the public health response in the aftermath of the 2010 Haiti earthquake and the cholera outbreak in 2012. On 26 March 2020, the President of Haiti Jovenel Moïse chose him as a member of the 17-member scientific council tasked to fight the COVID-19 pandemic in the country.

Political career
Henry entered politics as a leader of the Democratic Convergence movement which sought to topple President Jean-Bertrand Aristide, who was accused of rigging the 2000 Haitian parliamentary election. He and Micha Gaillard led the opposition against the President at international forums. After the 2004 Haitian coup d'état that ousted Aristide, Henry called for a transition government based on consensus and new elections. He later became a part of the "council of sages", consisting of seven members. The council was backed by the United States and elected members of the transitional government.

He supported René Préval after he was elected as the President and was appointed as the director general of the Ministry of Health in June 2006. He remained in the position until September 2008, when he was appointed as the ministry's chief of staff from September 2008 to October 2011. During his tenure, he dealt with the strikes at the General Hospital in Port-au-Prince, worked alongside the United States in managing the public health response after the 2010 earthquake, and streamlined the ministry's finances, enabling direct American funding of its programs.

Henry is a former member of Social Democratic Party, Haitian Revolutionary Progressive Nationalist Party which was founded by his long-time friend and political mentor Serge Gilles, Fusion of Haitian Social Democrats and Inite. He was selected as the Minister of Interior and Territorial Communities in 2015 by President Michel Martelly, after the latter reached a deal with the opposition parties following anti-government protests, many of them led by followers of Aristide. Henry served in the post from 22 January 2015 to 11 September 2015, when he was appointed as the Minister of Social Affairs and Labor by Prime Minister Evans Paul and replaced by Ardouin Zéphirin. He remained in the position until 28 March 2016. After Inite announced it would withdraw from Martelly's unity government on 8 September 2015, it called on Henry to resign. Henry however refused and left the party.

On 5 July 2021, he was selected as the next prime minister of Haiti by President Jovenel Moïse, but two days later, Moïse was assassinated, stalling the transfer of power. At the time, incumbent Prime Minister Claude Joseph took control of the government, with the backing of the military, and was acknowledged by the United States as the rightful prime minister. A group of prominent diplomats to Haiti called the "Core Group", which is made up of ambassadors to Haiti from Brazil, the European Union, France, Germany, Spain, Canada and the United States, in addition to representatives to Haiti from the Organization of American States and the United Nations, called on Henry to take charge as the head of the government on 17 July. On 19 July, Joseph announced that he would stand down as prime minister in favor of Henry.

Prime Minister of Haiti

Henry was sworn in as the prime minister on 20 July 2021. During the ceremony, he called for unity and stated that he will prioritize reassuring people about restoring order and security in the country. He stated on 28 July that he planned to hold the long-delayed elections as soon as possible, and the government would hold dialogue with the civil society on what to do further for Haiti's progress.

After an earthquake struck Haiti on 14 August, Henry declared a state of emergency for one month in the country and stated that all resources would be mobilized to help people affected by the quake. During an address to the Permanent Council of the Organization of American States on 20 August, he vowed to hold elections as soon as possible to restore democracy in the country, despite the country reeling from instability following the recent earthquake and Moïse's assassination.

On 6 September, Henry described reducing crime in Haiti as a primary concern of his government. He introduced the draft of a proposed new constitution on 8 September. Among its provisions, the President is given further powers while the position of Prime Minister is abolished to allow government policies to be passed more easily. Government officials, ministers and presidents can also be tried before courts once they leave their office.

Henry signed an agreement for a consensual transitional government with opposition political parties on 11 September. Under the agreement, a new Provisional Electoral Council will be formed which will include members of Haitian diaspora in its functioning. Meanwhile, the government also agreed to hold a trial for the PetroCaribe scandal; in addition to conducting investigations into the massacres that occurred in La Saline, Bel Air and Delmas 32. The agreement contains provisions for the establishment of a two-headed executive of Haiti, while the country will be governed by the Council of Ministers under the leadership of Henry. It allows the elections to be delayed to late 2022. Over 169 political and civil organizations had signed the agreement until 12 September according to Henry, however he has sought support of more organizations.

At the 76th session of the United Nations General Assembly on 25 September, Henry spoke about the recent expulsion of Haitian migrants by the United States from its border with Mexico and stated that while he did not wish to challenge its right to expel illegal migrants, migration would continue until wealth inequality no longer existed in the world. He urged wealthy countries to help less-developed ones improve their living standards more quickly to prevent it, and criticized the United States Border Patrol agents for their conduct while stopping the Haitian migrants. Henry also stated that his government was trying to apprehend Moïse's killers and asked for "mutual legal assistance" before the assembly, while promising to restore democractic governance in Haiti quickly.

Henry dismissed all members of the Provisional Electoral Council, seen by many in the country as politically biased, on 27 September. The elections were postponed indefinitely and he promised to appoint a new election council. The next day, Henry told the Associated Press that he planned to hold the constitutional referendum in February 2022, and hoped to hold the elections in early-2022. He also stated that the Haitian migrants recently expelled from the Mexico–United States border would be assisted by the government in setting up small businesses, and criticized the treatment meted out to them by the United States.

Henry named a new ministerial cabinet on 24 November, consisting of eight new appointments. A 52-member National Transitional Council was named on 12 December under the "Montana Accord", a competing accord against Henry's own "September 11th Accord", being given the task of selecting a new president and prime minister until elections are held.

On 1 January 2022, it was reported that Henry had survived an assassination attempt after he fled Gonaïves during a shootout between his security forces and an armed group. The attempt on his life occurred outside the cathedral in Gonaives, where a ceremony marking the 218th anniversary of Haitian independence was taking place.  The incident resulted in one death and two others were injured. Henry accused "bandits" of trying to assassinate him, and stated that the state should never bow to their demands.

Delegates of various accords, including the Montana Accord, chose Fritz Jean as the interim president of Haiti on 17 January during a unitary summit. Henry however stated on Twitter that the next president would be elected by the Haitian people, apparently rejecting attempts at a transitional government. After the Montana Accord signatories chose Jean as the interim president and Steven Benoît as the prime minister in late January, Henry rejected giving recognition to it on 7 February. He also promised to announce the date of the elections soon, while his opponents demanded that he step down since the legal mandate of late president Jovenel Moïse, who had appointed him, formally expired that day.

In an interview with Miami Herald on 11 February, Henry stated that he was willing to hand over suspects in the case of Moïse's assassination to the United States, as he supported their investigation into the former president's death and believed that the Ministry of Justice and Public Security was weak. He also stated that he supported appointing a judge from another country to oversee the case independently in Haiti and he would seek the assistance of the Caribbean Community for it. During the 2 June meeting of the Aid Effectiveness Committee of the Coordination Framework of external aid for the development of Haiti, Henry stated that improving the security situation in the country was a prerequisite for holding the elections. On 11 September, he stated that the government will begin the organization of elections by the end of 2022.

An announcement by Henry on 11 September regarding a reduction in subsidies on fuel, more than doubling the cost of petrol, diesel and kerosene, led to countrywide protests and gangs preventing fuel from being unloaded at the Varreux terminal, creating a nationwide shortage. On 5 October, Henry appealed to the international community for help in resolving the crisis. Two days later, he and the Council of Ministers authorized the government to request international military assistance. The G9 alliance of gangs announced the lifting of their blockade of the Varreux terminal on 11 November.

Henry fired Justice Minister Berto Dorcé and Interior Minister Liszt Quitel on 14 November, three days after the Government Commissioner Jacques Lafontant was dismissed due to a complaint by Henry. Henry appointed himself as the acting Interior Minister, while Emmelie Prophete was appointed as the Justice Minister.

On 21 December 2022, Henry along with representatives of political parties, civil society organizations and private sector signed an agreement to hold the general elections in 2023, with the new government taking office on 7 February 2024. It also established a three-member High Council for the Transition with powers to take part in appointment of government officials and overseeing the various government departments, along with a Government Action Control Body to ensure that the compliance of the government with the rules and transparency.

Protesting police officers attacked the official residence of Henry and the Toussaint Louverture International Airport on 26 January 2023, in response to a rise in spate of killings of fellow officers. Henry, who was at the airport at the time, was able to escape. The High Council for the Transition was formally installed by him on 6 February 2023.

Allegations of role in assassination of Jovenel Moïse

Henry was invited by Haiti's chief prosecutor Bedford Claude on 10 September 2021 for an interview regarding Moïse's assassination. Claude stated that Henry had been in contact with Joseph Felix Badio, one of the main suspects on the day of the assassination. Henry, however, rejected giving permission on the next day, calling it a "diversionary tactic".

Claude on 14 September requested the judge investigating the assassination to charge Henry and told the immigration authority to ban him from leaving the country. Henry meanwhile fired him, but a source told the BBC that he had no authority to take such an action.

Renald Lubérice, the secretary general of the Council of Ministers, resigned on 15 September due to the allegations against Henry and accused him of trying to obstruct justice. Henry meanwhile fired the Minister of Justice Rockefeller Vincent, who had ordered increased security for Bedford Claude citing threats to him. Henry's office addressed the allegations against him on 16 September, stating that he had received calls from numerous people inquiring about his safety after Moïse's assassination, and it could not identify every caller. It also dismissed suspicions against Henry, stating that contact with a suspect cannot be used to implicate someone in a case. Asked about his calls with Badio later by Associated Press, Henry stated that he did not remember them.

On 10 January 2022, an investigative report published by The New York Times stated that Henry had links with Joseph Felix Badio, an alleged mastermind of assassination of Moïse, and that the two stayed in close contact even after the assassination. Two Haitian officials told the newspaper that Badio entered Henry's residence twice without being impeded by the guards, despite being wanted. Another of the prime suspects, Rodolphe Jaar, while admitting to having financed and planned the assassination, stated that Badio had described Henry as someone he could count on as an ally and could control after overthrowing Moïse. Jaar claimed that Badio had sought Henry's help in escaping, to which he agreed.

On 8 February, a recording of judge Garry Orélien, who previously oversaw the investigation of the assassination, was obtained by CNN in which Orélien accused Henry of being among those who planned the assassination of Moïse. He also accused Henry of being "connected and friends with" the mastermind of the assassination. This claim was also backed by multiple Haitian law enforcement officials who had investigated the assassination as well, and who also told CNN that Henry was obstructing the investigation. Orélien later in an interview with Radio Television Caraïbes denied accusing Henry, while claiming that the CNN report intended to murder his career and force him to go into exile or be killed.

Henry on 11 February dismissed the allegations of his involvement as "fake news" and called on Badio to hand himself over to the authorities. He also added that no Haitian or American official had questioned him regarding the case.

Personal life
Ariel Henry is the son of Elie S. Henry, who was a pastor and an elder of the Seventh-day Adventist Church. Ariel's father died on 20 December 2015. He is married to Annie Claude Massiau and his siblings are named Monique Henry, Edlyne Henry Richard, Elie Henry and Elvire Henry. His brother Elie is also a pastor and is the president of the Inter-American Division of Seventh-day Adventists.

References

1949 births
Living people
Boston University alumni
Haitian neurosurgeons
Haitian physicians
Loma Linda University alumni
Presidents of Haiti
Prime Ministers of Haiti
University of Montpellier alumni
Place of birth missing (living people)